Fletcher Branch is a stream in Butler County in the U.S. state of Missouri.

Fletcher Branch has the name of an early citizen.

See also
List of rivers of Missouri

References

Rivers of Butler County, Missouri
Rivers of Missouri